Mount Moroto, also Moroto Mountain, is a mountain in the Northeastern part of Uganda. 

The native name for this mountain was "Moru To" (meaning "the western mountain" derived from the words "Moru" meaning mountain and "To" meaning west). It was named so because during the migration of the native tribes, who originated from Ethiopia, it appeared west.

Location
The mountain is adjacent to the town of Moroto in Moroto District, Karamoja, Northern Region of Uganda. Mount Moroto is one of a chain of volcanoes along Uganda's international border with Kenya that begins with Mount Elgon in the south and includes Mount Kadam and Mount Morungole. The region around Mount Moroto is a forest reserve protecting a range of habitats from arid thorn savanna to dry montane forest. The coordinates of Mount Moroto are 2°31'30.0"N, 34°46'21.0"E (Latitude:2.5250; Longitude:34.7725).

Mountain climbing
The nature reserve that encloses Mount Moroto measures  and contains over 220 bird species, monkeys and wild cats. Climbing trails exist and mountain guides are available.

Farming and irrigation
The natural springs on the slopes of the mountain coalesce to form springs and small rivers. The World Food Program is teaching the Karimajong people how to harvest and store that water and use it to irrigate agricultural produce for household food and for income generation.

Demographics
Speakers of the moribund Soo language live on the slopes of Mount Moroto.

See also 
 List of Ultras of Africa
 Rwenzori Mountains

References

External links
 "Moroto, Uganda" on Peakbagger
 Uganda’s Lawless Mountain: Mt Moroto

Mountains of Uganda
Stratovolcanoes of Uganda
Moroto District
Volcanoes of the Great Rift Valley
East African montane forests